Lloyd Cole and the Commotions were a British rock/pop band that formed in Glasgow, Scotland in 1982. Between 1984 and 1989, the band scored four Top 20 albums and five Top 40 singles in the UK; it also had success in several other countries including Australia, the Netherlands, Sweden and New Zealand. After they broke up in 1989, Cole embarked on a solo career but the band reformed briefly in 2004 to perform a 20th anniversary mini-tour of the UK and Ireland.

Band history

The band were formed whilst Cole (who was born in Derbyshire, England) was studying at the University of Glasgow. They signed to Polydor Records; their debut single "Perfect Skin" reaching number 26 on the UK chart in spring 1984, while the second single "Forest Fire" reached 41. Their first album, Rattlesnakes, was released in October 1984. Produced by Paul Hardiman and featuring string arrangements by Anne Dudley, it peaked at No. 13 in the UK and was certified gold for sales over 100,000 copies. NME included it in its Top 100 Albums of All Time list, and the title track was later covered by the American singer Tori Amos. The Welsh band Manic Street Preachers included the album amongst their top ten list.

The band's follow-up album, Easy Pieces, was produced by Clive Langer and Alan Winstanley (who had previously produced for Madness, the Teardrop Explodes and Elvis Costello and the Attractions). Released in November 1985, the album was a quicker commercial success than its predecessor (entering the UK album chart at No. 5, and certified gold within a month). The singles "Brand New Friend" and "Lost Weekend" were the band's first and only UK top 20 hits (reaching No. 19 and No. 17 respectively).

Two years later, the band released their third and final album, Mainstream. Produced by Ian Stanley (former writer and keyboard player of Tears for Fears), the album peaked at No. 9 in the UK and was also certified gold, but contained only one UK top 40 single, "Jennifer She Said" (No. 31). Its first single "My Bag]", and a later release, the "From the Hip" EP, failed to make the top 40.

In 1989, the band decided to split up and released a "best of" compilation, 1984–1989, which was their fourth top 20 album (UK No. 14) and fourth gold certification. Following this, Cole embarked on a solo career with the release of his eponymous album in 1990.

On the first two Commotions albums, Cole was the band's main songwriter (though he co-wrote several songs with various bandmembers). The third album is credited to the band as a whole.

In 2006, Scottish band Camera Obscura released the song "Lloyd, I'm Ready to Be Heartbroken" as an answer song to the Commotions' 1984 hit "(Are You) Ready to Be Heartbroken?".

Band members
Lloyd Cole (born 31 January 1961) – vocals, guitar, lyricist
Blair Cowan (born 1960?) – keyboards
Lawrence Donegan (born 13 July 1961) – bass guitar
Neil Clark (born 3 July 1958) – guitar
Stephen Irvine (born 16 December 1959) – drums

The band's manager Derek McKillop is credited as a full band member in the credits of the group's third album, Mainstream.

Post-breakup careers
Cole moved to New York City and later to New England to pursue a solo career with Polydor/Capitol Records and later appeared on Rykodisc, before establishing self-published entities in the United States. His solo career has found him collaborating with the late Robert Quine, Fred Maher, Dave Derby and Jill Sobule.
Clark continued working with Cole on almost all of his solo releases and full band tours. He was also a member of the short-lived group Bloomsday, with Irvine (of the Commotions) and Chris Thomson of The Bathers. He later worked as a website designer and wrote music for film and TV.
Cowan collaborated with Cole and his new backing band in New York on Cole's first two solo albums. He played with Del Amitri, Paul Quinn and the Independent Group, the Kevin McDermott Orchestra and Texas.
Donegan is a journalist and an author – he was a golf journalist for The Guardian and published several non-fiction titles, including No News at Throat Lake and Four Iron in the Soul.
Irvine joined former bandmate Clark in Bloomsday, and as a session musician worked with Del Amitri, Étienne Daho and Sarah Cracknell. He is also managing artists and bands.

Discography

 Rattlesnakes (1984, No. 13 UK)
 Easy Pieces (1985, No. 5 UK)
 Mainstream (1987, No. 9 UK)

References

Musical groups from Glasgow
Scottish rock music groups
British indie pop groups
Scottish new wave musical groups
Jangle pop groups
Musical groups established in 1982
1982 establishments in Scotland
Musical groups disestablished in 1989
Geffen Records artists
Polydor Records artists